An arrondissement is a level of administrative division in France generally corresponding to the territory overseen by a subprefect. , the 101 French departments were divided into 332 arrondissements (including 12 overseas).

The capital of an arrondissement is called a subprefecture. When an arrondissement contains the prefecture (capital) of the department, that prefecture is the capital of the arrondissement, acting both as a prefecture and as a subprefecture. Arrondissements are further divided into cantons and communes.

The term arrondissement can be roughly translated into English as district.

Role and administration
The administration of an arrondissement is assigned to a subprefect who assists the departmental prefect.

Unlike French regions, departments and communes, arrondissements do not have the status of legal entity in public law. In addition, unlike those other administrative divisions, they are not run by elected officials, but by political appointees, officials appointed by the French president.

History
The concept of arrondissements was proposed several times as an administrative reform during the Ancien Régime, notably by the intendant of the généralité of Brittany, Caze de La Bove, in his Mémoire concernant les subdélégués de l'intendance de Bretagne in 1775.

The arrondissements were created after the French Revolution by the Loi du 28 pluviôse in the year VIII of the Republican Calendar (17 February 1800) and replaced "districts". In certain periods in French history, they have served a role in legislative elections, especially during the Third Republic. In 1926, 106 arrondissements were suppressed by the government. While it claimed it was to achieve fiscal savings, some political analysts considered the results electoral manipulation. Some of these suppressed arrondissements were restored in 1942.

Changes
The most recent creations and disestablishments of arrondissements are listed in the table below.

Statistics
Most departments have only three or four arrondissements. The departments of Paris and of the Territoire de Belfort have only one, while the department of Pas-de-Calais has seven. Mayotte has none.

See also

 Administrative divisions of France
 Arrondissement
 Arrondissements of Paris
 List of arrondissements of France
 Municipal arrondissements of France

References

 
Subdivisions of France
France 3